The Tupolev Tu-85 (USAF/DoD reporting name: "Type 31", NATO reporting name: Barge) was a Soviet prototype strategic bomber based on the Tu-4, an unlicensed, reverse engineered copy of the Boeing B-29 Superfortress. It was the ultimate development of the B-29 family, being over 50% heavier than its progenitor and had nearly double the range. Only two prototypes were built before the program was cancelled in favor of the turboprop powered Tupolev Tu-95 bomber which could cover the same range at a far higher speed.

Development
Neither the Tu-4 nor the Tupolev Tu-80 were true intercontinental strategic bombers as they both lacked the range to attack the United States from bases in the Soviet Union and return. The Tu-85 was designed to achieve the necessary range by use of more powerful and fuel-efficient engines, a redesigned wing to increase the lift/drag ratio and the addition of more fuel. A large number of engines were considered before settling on the  Shvetsov ASh-2K, essentially two air-cooled ASh-82 radial engines paired together and the liquid-cooled  Dobrynin VD-4K six-bank inline engine, similar in configuration to the unsuccessful German Junkers Jumo 222. Both proposed powerplants were given turbochargers and power-recovery turbines to turn them into turbo-compound engines. The Shvetsov design was preferred, but was not yet mature enough for use, and the VD-4K was selected. A lot of effort was put into refining the design of the wing in collaboration with TsAGI. It had an aspect ratio of 11.745 and a taper of 2.93 for optimum lift at high altitudes. The Tu-85 carried  of fuel in 48 flexible tanks.

Much of the armament and equipment was derived from those of the late-model Tu-4, including the four remotely-controlled dorsal and ventral gun turrets and the tail turret, each with two  Nudelman-Rikhter NR-23 cannon. But the Tu-85's tail turret had a Argon range-only radar and each of the two bomb bays was enlarged to hold a  FAB-9000 bomb.

Actual design work began in August 1948 and was ratified by a directive from the Council of Ministers dated 16 September that required the first prototype to be ready for manufacturer's tests in December 1950. Construction of the first aircraft began in July 1950 and was completed in September. It first flew on 9 January 1951 and the manufacturer's tests lasted until October. The second prototype, sometimes referred to as the 85D or 85/2, incorporated the lessons learned from the first aircraft, including revision and reinforcement of the airframe and a variety of changes to its equipment and systems. It was first flown on 28 June 1951 and its trials lasted until November. 

Series production was approved on 23 March 1951 at three factories where it would succeed the Tu-4 on the production line, but this was reversed later in the year and the program was cancelled; during the Korean War Soviet MiG-15s brought down many American B-29s, showing that there was no longer a future in aerial combat for piston-powered aircraft. Priority was given to the higher-performance turboprop Tu-95 'Bear', as its own turboprop powerplants, the TV-12 prototype series for the Kuznetsov NK-12 turboprops that power the Tu-95 to this day, were already generating  as early as 1951.

Specifications (Tu-85/1, 4VD-4K)

See also

References

Notes

Bibliography
 
 

1950s Soviet bomber aircraft
Tu-0085
Four-engined tractor aircraft
Tu-85
Mid-wing aircraft
Aircraft first flown in 1951
Four-engined piston aircraft